Isaac Harmon Farmhouse is a historic farmhouse located near Millsboro, Sussex County, Delaware. It was built about 1845, and is a two-story, four bay, single pile, wood frame dwelling clad in clapboard.  It has a gable roof pierced by interior end brick chimneys. It was one of the first properties in the Indian River community to be owned by an Indian family. Isaac Harmon was one of the leaders in the Nanticoke separatist movement of the 1880s.

It was added to the National Register of Historic Places in 1979.

References

Houses on the National Register of Historic Places in Delaware
Houses completed in 1845
Houses in Sussex County, Delaware
Nanticoke tribe
National Register of Historic Places in Sussex County, Delaware